Mar de Rosas is a 1977 Brazilian film directed by Ana Carolina. In November 2015, the film  was ranked 81st by the Brazilian Film Critics Association (Abraccine) on its list of the 100 best Brazilian films of all time.

Cast 
Norma Bengell as Felicidade
Cristina Pereira as Betinha
Hugo Carvana as Sérgio
Miriam Muniz as Dona Niobi
Otávio Augusto as Orlando Barde
Ary Fontoura as Dr. Dirceu
Maria Silva as Woman in the train

Awards 
1978: Associação Paulista dos Críticos de Arte Awards
Best Picture (won)
Best Actress (Norma Bengell) (won) 
Best Actor (Otávio Augusto) (won)
Best Director (Ana Carolina) (won)
Best Screenplay (Ana Carolina) (won)

See also 
Abraccine Top 100 Brazilian films

References

External links 
 

1970s Portuguese-language films
1977 films
Brazilian comedy films
Brazilian comedy-drama films
Best Picture APCA Award winners